Raid on Rommel is an American B movie in Technicolor from 1971, directed by Henry Hathaway and set in North Africa during the Second World War. It stars Richard Burton as a British commando attempting to destroy German gun emplacements in Tobruk. Much of the action footage was reused from the 1967 film Tobruk, and the storyline is also largely the same.

Plot 
In Libya in 1942, Captain Alex Foster (Burton), an intelligence officer with the British Army, allows himself to be captured by a German Afrika Korps convoy transporting British prisoners, pretending to be injured. Once integrated with the prisoners, consisting of a medical unit and remnants of a commando force, Foster outlines his plans to take over the convoy, with the help of the prisoners, and redirect it towards the Libyan port town of Tobruk.

On the way, they find an unexpected concentration of German tanks, and they surmise that a fuel depot must be hidden nearby. Foster, in Afrika Corps uniform, and Major Tarkington (Clinton Greyn), the medical officer as his 'prisoner', gain access to the depot and meet Field Marshal Erwin Rommel (Wolfgang Preiss). During a friendly dispute over philately between Rommel and Tarkington, Foster notices a map which indicates the location of the fuel depot.

They make excuses, leave, capture a tank, and blow up the fuel dump. They escape towards Tobruk, where they destroy a coastal battery. The prisoners are embarked in boats launched by attacking Royal Navy warships. However, Foster and Tarkington are captured by German soldiers. The film leaves their fates unexplained.

The only female character in the film, a civilian, is held against her will, drugged, (implied) raped, and abandoned at the side of the road.

Cast 
 Richard Burton as Capt. Alex Foster
 John Colicos as Sgt. Allan MacKenzie
 Clinton Greyn as Maj. Hugh Tarkington
 Wolfgang Preiss as Erwin Rommel
 Danielle de Metz as Vivianne Gagliardo
 Karl-Otto Alberty as Capt. Heinz Schroeder
 Christopher Cary as Cpl. Peter Merrihew
 John Orchard as Dan Garth
 Brook Williams as Sgt. Joe Reilly
 Greg Mullavy as Pte. Ed Brown
 Ben Wright as Admiral
 Michael Sevareid as Cpl. Bill Wembley
 Chris Anders as Tank Sergeant

Reception 
The film was poorly received by critics. It has a 32% rating on Rotten Tomatoes.

In 2006, the BBC's Radio Times wrote: "It says a lot for Richard Burton that he was able to plumb the depths in dreary Second World War action movies such as this one, about a British officer releasing prisoners to attack Tobruk, without doing any apparent damage to his career. Even the usually dependable director Henry Hathaway falters in this flawed effort that was originally meant for TV".

See also 
 List of American films of 1971

References

External links 
 
 Amazon viewer reviews of the film
 
 
 

1971 films
1971 war films
American war films
1970s English-language films
Films directed by Henry Hathaway
Universal Pictures films
North African campaign films
Cultural depictions of Erwin Rommel
1970s American films